Rosati-Kain High School is an all-girls Catholic high school in St. Louis, Missouri. Rosati-Kain is accredited as a college preparatory school by the North Central Association, the Missouri Department of Education, and the Roman Catholic Archdiocese of Saint Louis.

History

Rosati-Kain High school was the first and remains the oldest Archdiocesan high school in the Roman Catholic Archdiocese of St. Louis. In 1911, the School Sisters of Notre Dame and the Sisters of St. Joseph of Carondelet joined their two centers to start Rosati-Kain High School. The school began educating young women. The school is named for bishops Joseph Rosati and John Joseph Kain.

Between the years of 1911 and 1920, the nuns served as faculty and taught without being paid. They supported the operational expenses of the school by selling needlework and teaching music. In 1919, the school had outgrown its building at the St. Vincent Seminary site at Lucas and Grand Avenues. The school moved to the Hayes Mansion on Newstead at the corner of Lindell.

In 1921, the Hayes Mansion was moved to make room to build a new larger structure designed by architect Henry P. Hess. This structure was completed in 1922 and remains the main building for Rosati-Kain. In 1941, the gymnasium, cafeteria, and music room were added to the property with funding raised by the Alumnae Association.

By the mid 1940s, over 1,000 students attended Rosati-Kain in two different shifts, one in the morning and one in the afternoon. Rosati-Kain became the first high school in the St. Louis area to integrate, enrolling five African-American students in 1946. Rosati-Kain has changed greatly over the past 100 years, morphing from a typical all-female finishing school to become a college preparatory high school for girls.

The 2011-12 school year marked the 100th anniversary of Rosati-Kain, and the institution held a year-long Centennial Celebration at that time. A new school song was written specifically for the Centennial Celebration by faculty members Luanne Murphy and Laura Govero-Yann.

On September 28, 2022, the St. Louis Post-Dispatch reported that the Archdiocese of Saint Louis planned to close Rosati-Kain along with St. Mary's High School at the end of the 2022-2023 school year.  The school closures appear to be part of the archdiocese's "All Things New Plan" which is expected to see dozens of parishes and grade schools close once the plan is finalized in the Spring of 2023.. In December 2022, it was announced that the school would remain open under a new name, Rosati-Kain Academy.

Awards
In 2009, BusinessWeek Magazine and GreatSchools.net named Rosati-Kain the Top Parents' Choice Private High School in the state of Missouri.

Campus
Located in St. Louis' historic Central West End, Rosati-Kain is located just east of the Cathedral Basilica of St. Louis.

Students
Rosati-Kain is a geographically diverse girls high school in the St. Louis metropolitan area, with students coming from throughout the metropolitan St. Louis area, including St. Louis City and St. Louis County, Jefferson County, St. Charles County and Illinois (64 zip codes and 118 elementary schools). Admission is based on standardized test scores and grade school records.  To be accepted into Rosati-Kain, an applicant should meet the following criteria: an A/B average for grades 6, 7 and 8; standardized test scores in the 70th percentile or above for grades 6, 7 and 8; and a good conduct and attendance record for grades 6, 7 and 8.

Notable alumni
Morgan DeBaun, founder of Blavity
Irene Hannon, author
Margie Imo, co-founder of Imo's Pizza
Ann Leckie, author
Ellen Foley, actress/singer
Robin Ransom, first African-American woman appointed to the Missouri Supreme Court

Sources

Notes and references

External links
Rosati-Kain High School

Roman Catholic Archdiocese of St. Louis
Roman Catholic secondary schools in St. Louis
Educational institutions established in 1911
Girls' schools in Missouri
1911 establishments in Missouri